The 2022–23 season is the 117th season in the history of Olympique de Marseille and their 27th consecutive season in the top flight. The club are participating in Ligue 1, Coupe de France, and UEFA Champions League. The season covers the period from 1 July 2022 to 30 June 2023.

Players

First-team squad

Out on loan

Transfers

In

Out

Pre-season and friendlies

Competitions

Overall record

Ligue 1

League table

Results summary

Results by round

Matches 
The league fixtures were announced on 17 June 2022.

Coupe de France

UEFA Champions League

Group stage 

The draw for the group stage was held on 25 August 2022.

Statistics

Appearances and goals

|-
! colspan=14 style=background:#dcdcdc; text-align:center| Goalkeepers

|-
! colspan=14 style=background:#dcdcdc; text-align:center| Defenders

|-
! colspan=14 style=background:#dcdcdc; text-align:center| Midfielders

|-
! colspan=14 style=background:#dcdcdc; text-align:center| Forwards

|-
! colspan=14 style=background:#dcdcdc; text-align:center| Players transferred out during the season

References 

Olympique de Marseille seasons
Olympique de Marseille
2022–23 UEFA Champions League participants seasons